Manchester Community College may refer to:

Manchester Community College (Connecticut)
Manchester Community College (New Hampshire)

See also
Manchester College (disambiguation)